Lyle Gordon Moffat (born March 19, 1948) is a retired professional ice hockey player who played 96 games in the National Hockey League and 276 games in the World Hockey Association. He played for the Toronto Maple Leafs, Cleveland Crusaders, and Winnipeg Jets between 1973 and 1980.

Career statistics

Regular season and playoffs

External links 
 

1948 births
Living people
Canadian ice hockey coaches
Canadian ice hockey left wingers
Cleveland Crusaders players
Kamloops Junior Oilers coaches
Michigan Tech Huskies men's ice hockey players
Oklahoma City Blazers (1965–1977) players
Ice hockey people from Calgary
Toronto Maple Leafs players
Tulsa Oilers (1964–1984) players
Undrafted National Hockey League players
Victoria Cougars (WHL) coaches
Winnipeg Jets (1979–1996) players
Winnipeg Jets (WHA) players